Wnory-Wiechy  is a village in the administrative district of Gmina Kulesze Kościelne, within Wysokie Mazowieckie County, Podlaskie Voivodeship, in north-eastern Poland.

The village has a population of 120.

References

Wnory-Wiechy